Yamethin District is a district of the Mandalay Region in central Myanmar.

Townships
The district contains the following townships:

Pyawbwe Township
Yamethin Township

Districts of Myanmar
Mandalay Region